Saigon Adventist Hospital or US Army 3rd Field Hospital was an Adventist hospital in Ho Chi Minh City.  It was a private hospital, formerly operated by the United States Army before being given to the Seventh-day Adventist Church. The hospital was operated by the Loma Linda University School of Medicine and performed the only open heart surgery operation in Vietnam at the time. The hospital was a former mansion converted to facilitate 38 hospital beds.

In March 1973, the hospital was moved from the location at the Phu Nhuan crossroads to the former US Army 3rd Field Hospital.  The move was to be temporary until construction of a new hospital at another location was completed.

More than 410 employees and church workers escaped before the Fall of Saigon. However, thousands of members and many pastors and teachers and other employees remained behind in Vietnam. The remaining members reorganised the work in Vietnam. Some of these members lost their lives while some were forced into re-education camps. Many of the workers could not move or travel from one area to another without permission. Most of the churches were shut down, and all the schools were closed.

See also 

List of Seventh-day Adventist hospitals

References

External links
Saigon: The Final Days by Ralph S. Watts

Hospitals affiliated with the Seventh-day Adventist Church
1975 disestablishments in Vietnam
Former Seventh-day Adventist institutions